Milton Keynes Dons Football Club is an English association football club based in Milton Keynes, Buckinghamshire that has competed in the English Football League (Championship, League One and League Two, the second, third and fourth tiers in English football respectively) since the team was founded. The club found itself in League One after Wimbledon F.C. relocated to Milton Keynes in 2003. The club gave back Wimbledon's trophies to the London Borough of Merton in 2007, and since then, officially, the club is considered to have been founded in 2004. The MK Dons currently compete in League One as of the 2019–20 season.

The Dons record against each club faced in league competition is summarised below. The team's first league match was contested with Barnsley in the opening game of the 2004–05 Football League One season. They met their 89th and most recent different league opponent, Burton Albion, for the first time in the 2019–20 EFL League One season. The teams that the MK Dons have met most in league competition are Oldham Athletic, Swindon Town and Walsall, against whom they have contested 24 league matches. The team has won 13 matches against Oldham, the most they have won against any team. Nine of the matches against Walsall have ended in a draw, the most draws registered by the club. Peterborough United have defeated the MK Dons eleven times each which is the most the MK Dons have lost against any team.

Key
 The table includes results of matches played by Milton Keynes Dons in the English Football League (Championship, League One and League Two).
   Teams with this background and symbol in the "Club" column are competing in the 2021–22 EFL League One alongside Milton Keynes Dons.
   Clubs with this background and symbol in the "Club" column are defunct.
 P = matches played; W = matches won; D = matches drawn; L = matches lost; F = Goals scored (For); A = Goals conceded (Against); Win% = percentage of total matches won
 The columns headed "First" and "Last" contain the first and most recent seasons in which Milton Keynes Dons played league matches against each opponent

All-time league record
All statistics are correct up to and including the match played 30 April 2022.

Notes

References

External links
 Head to Head stats on MK Dons website

League record by opponent
Milton Keynes Dons